Rudy Landscape Park (full name Park Krajobrazowy Cysterskie Kompozycje Krajobrazowe Rud Wielkich: "Landscape Park of the Cistercian Landscape Compositions of Rudy Wielkie") is a protected area (Landscape Park) in southern Poland, established in 1993, covering an area of .

The Park lies within Silesian Voivodeship: in Gliwice County (Gmina Pilchowice, Gmina Sośnicowice), Pszczyna County (Gmina Suszec), Racibórz County (Gmina Nędza) and Rybnik County (Gmina Czerwionka-Leszczyny, Gmina Gaszowice, Gmina Jejkowice, Gmina Lyski).

Protected are the remnants of natural riparian and oak-hornbeam forests, typical of the upper Odra valley, as well as ponds - breeding grounds for birds and habitats of rare mud and water plants (e.g. yellow watercress, water caltrop). Monuments of animate and inanimate nature include an erratic boulder northeast of Rybnik-Paruszowiec.

References 

Rudy
Parks in Silesian Voivodeship